The Diamond grape is a white grape which is a cross between the Concord and Iona grapes. It was developed in the 1880s in New York. It is used today in table wines and grape juice.

References

White wine grape varieties